Otan Korgaushilar Monument is a city memorial in Nur-Sultan, the capital of Kazakhstan. It is in Defenders of the Fatherland Square near Tauelsizdik Avenue. It primarily commemorates the Kazakhs who were sent to serve in the Soviet Army during the Great Patriotic War (World War II) as well as veterans of the Kazakh Armed Forces. In the Kazakh language, "Otan Korgaushilar" is the term used for "Defenders of the Fatherland". Dignitaries such as Alexander Lukashenko, Moon Jae-in, Angela Merkel, Sadyr Japarov and Kassym-Jomart Tokayev have in years past visited and laid wreaths at the memorial. Victory Day Parades commonly takes place at the memorial on 9 May.

The opening was on Victory Day in 2001. The foundation stone of the monument was laid on 10 June 1998 by the President of Kazakhstan, Nursultan Nazarbayev.

Design
It elevated from the ground by a granite foundation, where a bronze stele is also situated. The memorial is 24 meters in height and is made of 63 tones of bronze. The central figure of the monument is a woman holding a golden cup, symbolizing peace and prosperity. Soviet soldiers are depicted on the right while on the left side, Kazakh batyrs are portrayed smashing people from the Dzungar tribes. There is an eternal flame burning at the foot of the monument. The flame was part of a burning flame at the Park of 28 Panfilov Guardsmen brought from Almaty.  There is a park built around the monument. The ceneral contractor was the Gorkommunkhoz company, with the two commissioned architects being A. Beksultanov and N.Konopoltsev.

References 

Astana
Buildings and structures completed in 2001
Monuments and memorials in Kazakhstan